Rusdi Genest  (born 1939 in Sherbrooke, Quebec) is a Quebec sculptor known for his symbolic surrealistic art bronzes by the lost-wax casting process and his hand-pressed mural reliefs in fine art papermaking. He was inducted into the Royal Canadian Academy of Arts (RCA) in 2013.

Education and teaching
Genest earned an MFA from the Université du Québec à Montréal. He studied art at the École nationale supérieure des Beaux-Arts (ENSBA), at the École nationale supérieure des arts appliqués et des métiers d'art (ENSAAMA) in Paris, and at the California State University, Long Beach. He was a professor at the Université du Québec à Chicoutimi (UQAC), Saguenay and at the Sadie Bronfman School of fine arts in Montréal. He has taught courses at the California State College at Sonoma, at the Boston and the Cambridge Centers for Adult Education.

Genest has been awarded subsidies and research grants by the Quebec Ministry of Culture and Communications.

Honors and awards
In June 2013, Genest was inducted into the Royal Canadian Academy of Arts. He has received awards from the Minister of Interior of the Republic of Italy, from Art Credo, Toronto, Canada, from the Governor of the Province of Ravenna, Italy; he earned a Medal from the Salon des Arts et des Lettres de Paris Sud, France, and from the Monterey and the Mill Valley Festivals of the Arts, Ca., USA.

Art integration to architecture
Centre d'accueil Mgr Victor Tremblay (Details), Chicoutimi, Qc
Centre d'accueil Beaumanoir (Second art), Saguenay, Qc
Centre d'accueil Cité des Prairies, Montréal, Qc.

Works in public collections
Smithsonian Institution in Washington DC, Museo Dantesco of Ravenna in Italy, State Museum of Berlin, the British Museum of London (Medals), Museum of Wroclaw in Poland, Residence of the " Délégué Général du Québec " in Paris, the Canadian Cultural Center, Paris, Library and Archives Canada, Ottawa, and AMSA in New York.

Artworks
Genest 's works have been exhibited in Canada, England, Finland, France, Germany, Hungary, Italy, Japan, Poland, Portugal, United States, Sweden and Switzerland.
He designed a medallion for the American Medallic Sculptural Association.

Summary of solo exhibitions
Montréal, Qc, Can Gallery, Bernard, " So goeth the Cosmos " 2010
Québec, Qc, Canada, Linda Verge Gallery, " Fugues in folly " 2007
Montréal, Qc, Galerie Bernard, " Fugues en folie " 2006
Montréal, Qc, Georges Laoun Gallery at the Museum, " Explosivities & Time stasis " 2002
Montréal, Qc, Galerie Bernard, " Explosivitées et Temps d'arrêts " 2001
Québec, Qc, Galerie Linda Verge, " Tissus Civilisations, Textures d'Humanités " 1999
Spokane, WA, US, Lorrinda Knight Gallery, " Bronze sketches & Paper manuscripts " 1995
Toronto, Canadian Exchange Tower, " Whimsical Serenades for Strewn Ceremonials " 1994
Montréal, Can, John Abbott Gallery, " Rusdi Genest, Bronze, Stoneware & Paper art " 1992
Chicoutimi, Qc, Art Society's Virtual Space, " Affichages Sculpturaux, Clameurs et Visions " 1982
Montréal, Qc, University of Québec Gallery, " Affichages Sculpturaux, Clameurs et Visions " 1981
Montréal, Qc, Galerie d'art Les deux B, " Proximiser un devenir par passages intensifs " 1979
Montréal, Qc, Galerie Saint-Denis, " Mites et Mythes, bronzes cires perdues, dessins récents " 1978
Montréal, Qc, Galerie Balcon des Images, " L'univers ésotérique féminin " 1977
Paris, France, Canadian student residence, Cité universitaire, " Stylized feminin forms " 1972
Monterey, California, USA, Matrix Gallery, " Magical sketches in bronze " 1970
Carmel, California, USA, Tantamount Art Theatre, " Magical sketches in bronze " 1969
Hollywood, Ca., USA, Pan American Cultural Society, " Opera del sculptor Genesto " 1967
Beverly Hills, California, USA, Setay Gallery, " Lost wax cast bronze sculptures " 1966

Bibliography
Bernard Michel, " Rusdi Genest: Calendrier de la vie artistique », 2006
Andre Seleanu, " Rusdi Genest: Master of Narrative », The Medal # 42, Spring 2003, p. 32
Andre Seleanu, " Les engrenages allégoriques Rusdi Genest ", Vie des Arts, No. 183, été 01, p. 53
Andre Seleanu, " À faire, une œuvre de Rusdi Genest ", Espace Sculpture, Vol.5, # 2, hiver 1989, p. 22

References

External links
 
 A full page of English-French links about Rusdi Genest
 Rusdi Genest video (1.5 min.)

1939 births
Living people
Artists from Quebec
Canadian sculptors
People from Sherbrooke
Members of the Royal Canadian Academy of Arts